This is a list of Vanuatu Twenty20 International cricketers.

In April 2018, the ICC decided to grant full Twenty20 International (T20I) status to all its members. Therefore, all Twenty20 matches played between Vanuatu and other ICC members after 1 January 2019 will have T20I status.

This list comprises all members of the Vanuatu cricket team who have played at least one T20I match. It is initially arranged in the order in which each player won his first Twenty20 cap. Where more than one player won his first Twenty20 cap in the same match, those players are listed alphabetically by surname.

Key

List of players
Statistics are correct as of 17 March 2023.

Note: The following matches include one or more missing catchers in their Cricinfo scorecard and hence statistics (as of 19 July 2019):
 vs. Samoa (9 July 2019); 6 missing catchers
 vs. Papua New Guinea (12 July 2019); 5 missing catchers
 vs. Papua New Guinea (13 July 2019); 3 missing catchers

References 

Vanuatu